Liam Öhgren (born 28 January 2004) is a Swedish professional ice hockey left wing for Djurgårdens IF of the HockeyAllsvenskan (Allsv) on loan as a prospect to the Minnesota Wild of the National Hockey League (NHL). He was drafted 19th overall by the Wild in the 2022 NHL Entry Draft.

Playing career
During the 2021–22 season Öhgren split time between Djurgårdens' J20 team and SHL teams. He recorded 33 goals and 25 assists in 30 games in the J20 league. He recorded one goal and one assist in 25 games for the SHL team.

Following his selection in the 2022 NHL Entry Draft, Öhgren was signed to a three-year, entry-level contract with the Minnesota Wild on 17 July 2022.

International play

Öhgren represented Sweden at the 2022 IIHF World U18 Championships where hes served as team captain and recorded three goals and six assists in six games and won a gold medal.

Career statistics

Regular season and playoffs

International

References

External links
 

2004 births
Living people
Djurgårdens IF Hockey players
Minnesota Wild draft picks
National Hockey League first-round draft picks
Swedish ice hockey left wingers